The 1863 Jujuy earthquake took place in the province of Jujuy, Argentina on 15 January at about 11:00 (UTC-3).

This earthquake had a felt intensity of VIII on the Mercalli intensity scale. Its magnitude and duration made it exceptionally destructive, causing damage to the cathedral, the Cabildo (colonial government house) and precarious homes in San Salvador de Jujuy, the provincial capital.

See also
List of earthquakes in Argentina
List of historical earthquakes

References

  Instituto Nacional de Prevención Sísmica. Listado de Terremotos Históricos.

1863

Geology of Jujuy Province
Jujuy, 1863
Jujuy Earthquake, 1863
January 1863 events
1863 disasters in Argentina